Granny Creek is a stream in the U.S. state of West Virginia. It is a tributary of the Elk River.

Granny Creek was named after an explorer's grandmother.

See also
List of rivers of West Virginia

References

Rivers of Braxton County, West Virginia
Rivers of West Virginia